Prince of Pingyuan may refer to:

Rulers of Pingyuan Commandery during the Han period
Cao Rui (died 239), emperor of Cao Wei, known as Prince of Pingyuan before his coronation
Helian Ding (died 432), emperor of Xia, known as Prince of Pingyuan before his coronation
Buliugu Li (died 465), official of Northern Wei
Li Ning (Tang dynasty) (793–812), prince of the Tang dynasty
Han Tuozhou (1152–1207), official of the Song dynasty

See also
Lord of Pingyuan ( 308–251 BC)